Ruderting is a municipality  in the district of Passau in Bavaria in south-east Germany.

References

Passau (district)